A tilbury is a light, open, two-wheeled carriage, with or without a top, developed in the early 19th century by the London firm of Tilbury, coachbuilders in Mount Street (see also Stanhope (carriage)). A tilbury rig is little more than a single "tilbury seat"—the firm's characteristic spindle-backed seat with a curved padded backrest— mounted over a raked luggage boot, and fitted with a dashboard and mounting peg, all on an elaborate suspension system of curved leaf springs above the single axle. The tilbury has large wheels for moving fast over rough roads. A tilbury is fast, light, sporty and dangerous:
"A bad accident happened yesterday afternoon to M. Adolphe Fould, son of the Minister. He was seized with giddiness while driving his tilbury in the Champs Elysees and fell out of the vehicle. He was taken up senseless and conveyed to the Palace of the Exposition." – The Times, 9 November 1857. 

There is no connection with Tilbury in Essex.

See also
Gig (carriage)

Notes

References
Science and Society Picture Library - Search | Tilbury gig, c 1830 (illustrated)

Carriages